Marriage, Not Dating is a 2014 South Korean television series starring Yeon Woo-jin, Han Groo, Jeong Jin-woon, Han Sun-hwa, Heo Jung-min, and Yoon So-hee. It aired on tvN from July 4 to August 23, 2014 on Fridays and Saturdays at 20:40 (KST) time slot for 16 episodes.

Synopsis
Wealthy plastic surgeon Gong Gi-tae has no interest in getting married; marriage is all shop girl Joo Jang-mi dreams about. In an effort to get his parents off his back about the constant string of blind dates and marriage prospects, Gi-tae purposely brings Jang-mi home to meet his parents posing as his girlfriend, certain that they'll never approve of her. This romantic comedy portrays a man who doesn't want to get married, and a woman who has no luck with potential marriage prospects.

Cast

Main characters
Yeon Woo-jin as Gong Gi-tae
A 33-year-old successful plastic surgeon with an abrasive personality. Gi-tae enjoys solitude too much to settle down, much to the dismay of his parents.

Han Groo as Joo Jang-mi
A 29-year-old girl who earnestly believes in true love despite her countless failures in previous relationships. As an employee at a luxury brand shop, she is surrounded by luxury products, but has none of her own. Although her age and socio-economic class make her an unattractive bride in the "marriage market," Jang-mi still wants to find the right man to marry, because her greatest fear is being alone.

Jeong Jin-woon as Han Yeo-reum
A restaurant waiter with aspirations of becoming a chef. Though playful and sweet, Yeo-reum's painful past (his mother abandoned him as a child) makes him push away anyone who gets too close. But he finds himself falling for Jang-mi.

Han Sun-hwa as Kang Se-ah
Like her former fiancé Gi-tae, Se-ah is a rich, single plastic surgeon, plus her father is a hospital director. After their break-up, Se-ah's convinced that women (including herself) can do without men. In order to get pregnant, she begins to blackmail Gi-tae into giving her his sperm.

Heo Jung-min as Lee Hoon-dong
The owner of an upscale restaurant, and Gi-tae's best friend. Hoon-dong once dated Jang-mi but broke her heart and even accused her of being a stalker. But when she gets over him, he regrets his actions and begins pursuing her again.

Yoon So-hee as Nam Hyun-hee
Jang-mi's coworker who wants to hit the jackpot by marrying a rich man. Hyun-hee develops real feelings for Hoon-dong after their one-night stand.

Supporting characters
Kim Hae-sook as Shin Bong-hyang, Gi-tae's mother
Seemingly cold and aloof, she's obsessed with marrying off her son Gi-tae, but he constantly thwarts her schemes.

Kim Kap-soo as Gong Soo-hwan, Gi-tae's father
A doctor who's cheating on his wife with a younger mistress.

Im Ye-jin as Na So-nyeo, Jang-mi's mother
She and her husband run a chicken and soju restaurant, and are constantly bickering.

Park Jun-gyu as Joo Kyung-pyo, Jang-mi's father
He and his wife are so happy and excited to have a future doctor son-in-law, that Jang-mi is unable to tell her parents the real score between her and Gi-tae.

Park Hee-jin as Gong Mi-jung
She gets bribed by her sister-in-law Bong-hyang into tailing Gi-tae and Jang-mi, hoping to find proof that their relationship is fake.

Kim Young-ok as Noh Geum-soon
Gi-tae's grandmother, and the only member of his family who approves of Jang-mi.

Lee Bo-hee as Hoon-dong's mother
A wealthy widow who dotes on and spoils her only son.

Choi Hyun as Chef Uhm
He works at Hoon-dong's restaurant where he is skimming off the profits. He is also antagonistic towards Yeo-reum.

Lee Yeon-kyung as Soo-hwan's mistress
Moon Ji-hoo as Sin-woo
Park Hee-jin as Gong Mi-jung

Cameo/guest appearances
Lee Han-wi
Nam Ji-hyun as Ki-tae's blind date (ep 1)
Choi Dae-chul
Heo Jun
Ahn Hae-sook
Kim Jung-min as Power blogger with a plastic surgery addiction (ep 13)
Julien Kang as Richard Bernstein (ep 14)
Ko Kyu-pil (ep 13)

Ratings
In this table,  represent the lowest ratings and  represent the highest ratings.

Awards and nominations

Notes

References

External links
 

2014 South Korean television series debuts
2014 South Korean television series endings
TVN (South Korean TV channel) television dramas
Korean-language television shows
South Korean romantic comedy television series
Television series by IOK Media